Bataan, officially the Province of Bataan, is a province in the Central Luzon region of the Philippines. Its capital is the city of Balanga while Mariveles is the largest town in the province. Occupying the entire Bataan Peninsula on Luzon, Bataan is bordered by the provinces of Zambales and Pampanga to the north. The peninsula faces the South China Sea to the west and Subic Bay to the north-west, and encloses Manila Bay to the east.

The Battle of Bataan is known in history as one of the last stands of American and Filipino soldiers before they were overwhelmed by the Japanese forces in World War II. The Bataan Death March was named after the province, where the infamous march started.

History

Classical Period
The first inhabitants of the Bataan peninsula are the Ayta Magbeken people, who are one of the first Negrito ancestors of present-day Filipinos. Later on, Tagalog communities from southern Luzon migrated to parts of Bataan and the Ayta Magbeken migrated towards the mountain areas of Bataan by the end of the 16th century.

Colonial Period
In 1647, Dutch naval forces landed in the country in an attempt to seize the islands from Spain. The Dutch massacred the people of Abucay in Bataan.

Historian Cornelio Bascara documents that the province of Bataan was established on January 11, 1757, by Governor-General Pedro Manuel Arandia out of territories belonging to Pampanga and the corregimiento of Mariveles which, at that time, included Maragondon across Manila Bay.

World War II

Bataan featured prominently during World War II. Prior to the 1941 Japanese invasion, Bataan was a military reservation for the purpose of defending the fortress island of Corregidor. At the southern tip of the peninsula the U.S. Navy had established a small base at the port of Mariveles.

Shortly after the Japanese Army invaded the country in December 1941, the combined US and Filipino forces were being gradually overrun and General Douglas MacArthur moved his troops to the Bataan Peninsula in an attempt to hold out until a relief force could be sent from the US. Japanese forces started a siege of the peninsula on January 7, 1942, and launched an all-out assault on April 3, a few months after the Battle of the Points, Battle of the Pockets, the attack down Trail Number Two, and a half-dozen other brutal battles.  The Bataan campaign was the last time a regular cavalry unit of the U.S. Army, the Philippine Scouts 26th Cavalry, was used as a horse mounted fighting unit.  On the morning of January 16, 1942, Lt. Edwin Ramsey led the last cavalry charge into the town of Morong, routing the advancing Japanese infantry.  As the troops on Bataan were continually reduced in rations, the horses were eventually slaughtered to feed the starving soldiers.

Geography

Bataan lies in the southwestern part of the Central Luzon region. The province is bounded in the west by the South China Sea, in the south by the Corregidor Island, and in the east by Manila Bay - the gateway to the Philippines' political, social and economic center. It is bounded inland by the city of Olongapo in the north and by the provinces of Pampanga and Bulacan in the northeast. Its capital, the City of Balanga, is about 31.3 nautical miles from Manila across Manila Bay.

Geology
Bataan, a peninsula, is composed of 11 municipalities and one city. All except the northern most municipality of Dinalupihan, are coastal areas. The province's coastline is approximately 177 kilometers from Hermosa in the northeastern portion of the province, looping up to Morong in the northwest.

Bataan is divided by two mountain groups of volcanic origins. The northern side is composed of the Mount Natib (elevation ), Mount Sta. Rosa and Mount Silangan. The southern group is composed of Mount Mariveles, Mount Samat, and Mount Cuyapo. A narrow pass separates these two mountain groups. The topography of the province is classified generally as hilly and mountainous with a narrow plain on the eastern side. The highest elevation is in the Mariveles mountains at 1,388 meters above sea level.

Bataan has abundant water resources in the form of rivers, streams, creeks, waterfalls and springs. There are more than 100 rivers in the province radiating from the two aforementioned mountain groups. These are important not only for irrigation but also for navigation and fishing as well. The Talisay and Almacen Rivers are the two major rivers in the province. Talisay has its headwater in the Mariveles mountain group extending down to Pilar and Balanga into Manila Bay. Almacen River has its headwater in the Natib mountains extending down to Hermosa and exits through the Orani Channel to Manila Bay. Some of the smaller rivers are Abo-abo River, Bantalan River, Lamao River, Saysayin River, Agloloma River, Mamala River.

Coastline

Muddy tidal flats along the alluvial sandbars characterize the coastline along Manila Bay. Mangrove areas can be observed from Orani to Orion, along with seaweed areas and seagrass patches areas from portions of Balanga and Pilar down to Mariveles. The deeper portions are the coastal areas of Orion to Mariveles where most seaports are operating. Poor coral reef patches, mixed with sandy-rocky bottom can be found in Mariveles area, where the coastline begin to take on a rocky character looping from the mouth of Manila Bay to the western side of the province. The coastline facing the South China Sea is interspersed with pristine beaches with rocky portions and fringes of coral reef in good condition from Bagac to Morong, which is a haven for sea turtles and other marine animals.

Climate
Bataan has distinct dry and wet seasons categorized as Type I in the Philippines' Modified Coronas' Climate Classification (Climate of the Philippines). The dry season begins in November and ends in April, while the rainy season starts in May and ends in October. The most rains come in June to August. Mean average rainfall in August is the heaviest at 633mm. Bataan is often visited by typhoons. Farming systems in the province follow these climatic cycles.

Administrative divisions
Bataan is administratively subdivided into 11 municipalities and one component city.

Demographics

The demonym for natives of the province is Bataeño.

Tagalog and English are two of the predominant languages spoken in the province, as are the Philippines as a whole. The Tagalogs and Kapampangans speak both of these with their respective accents.

Ethnicity
The three most prominent ethnic groups in Bataan are the Tagalogs, the Kapampangans and the Ayta Magbeken, though the third group has a lower population despite being the province's first inhabitants. The second group is mainly present at the northeast of the province, as well as in the provincial capital to a lesser extent.

Religion
Various religious groups are subscribed to by the people but Roman Catholicism is the predominant religion, comprising 85.46% of the Bataan population. Several other Christian and non-Christian faiths include Iglesia ni Cristo (4.47%), Evangelicals (2.06%), Aglipayans (1.60%) and other groups.

Human Development
Bataan is amongst the provinces in the Philippines with high Human Development Index. The 2015 HDI of the province is 0.793.

Economy

Economic Significance 
Bataan is one of the most progressive provinces of Central Luzon and Manila Bay Region, and a key contributor to the region's overall economic productivity. The province is strategically located right in the middle of the country's growth triad corridor of Subic Special Economic and Freeport Zone, Clark Freeport and Special Economic Zone and Metro Manila. It is one of the Philippines' industrial heartland owing to the presence of heavy industries, two freeport zones and several special manufacturing zones. Due to these factors plus the province's competitive incentives offered to new business locators, the Philippine Chamber of Commerce and Industry adjudged Bataan as the most business friendly province in the country during the 47th Philippine Business Conference Expo held last November 2021. This is the second time the province had received such recognition, the first one was in 2018.

In 2020, Bataan registered the third highest locally sourced income among all the provinces in the Philippines as certified by the Department of Finance - Bureau of Local Government Finance (BLGF).

Industries and Manufacturing

Bataan hosts various industries, ranging from light to heavy. These industries are producing diverse products for domestic distribution and export such as refined petroleum products, petrochemicals, ammunitions, industrial grade explosives, marine cargo vessels, luxury yachts, pre-cast concrete, cement, steel building materials, animal feeds, fertilizers, fiberglass products, electronic components, medical personal protective equipment, paper, plastic products, optical lense, textile and leather products, and sporting goods and apparels. Dunlop Slazenger Philippines Inc. in the Freeport Area of Bataan, Mariveles specially takes pride as the exclusive producer of tennis balls used in The Championships, Wimbledon.

The largest industrial complexes operating in the province are listed below.
Petron Bataan Refinery or PBR (Limay) - is the only integrated oil refinery and petrochemical complex in the Philippines with rated capacity of 180,000 barrels per stream day (bpsd). In 2016, PBR commissioned its $2-Billion Upgrade Project dubbed the Refinery Master Plan Phase 2 (RMP-2). It enhanced the refinery's conversion capability and as a result, further enhanced the country's supply security. It also made Petron capable of locally producing fuels that meet global Euro IV and Euro VI emission standards. It has a Nelson Complexity Index of 13 making it among the most modern and complex refineries in Asia 
Philippine National Oil Corporation (PNOC) Industrial Park (Limay and Mariveles) - is previously known as PNOC-Philippine Petrochemical Development Complex, it's one of largest industrial complexes in the province housing various petrochemical manufacturers producing polyvinyl chloride (PVC), polyethylene (PE), and polypropylene (PP); and industrial explosives manufacturer Orica Philippines.
The Freeport Area of Bataan (FAB) (Mariveles) - is formerly known as Bataan Export Processing Zone (BEPZ; the first economic zone in the country)/Bataan Economic Zone (BEZ) until its conversion into a freeport zone on June 30, 2010, eight months after the enactment of Republic Act 9728 on October 23, 2009. This was later amended on August 30, 2019, through Republic Act 11453, giving powers to the freeport to expand its territory anywhere within the bounds of the province Bataan except the Hermosa and Morong portions of Subic Special Economic and Freeport Zone, another freeport zone located within the province. FAB is the third largest freeport zone in the country based in the number of investors and employment created, behind Clark Freeport and Subic Freeport. Currently, there are 95 companies operating in the freeport with half of these engaging in manufacturing and employing roughly 40,000 personnels and producing various products such as leather goods, electronics, textile, rubber and plastic products, medical PPE, fabricated metals, animal feeds, marine vessels and lenses. The total export value for these products reached more than US$913 million by end of 2022. FAB is also an emerging hub for fintech and blockchain businesses hosting a number of these companies.
Government Arsenal (Limay) -  is an agency of the Philippine government under the Department of National Defense, responsible for the production of basic weaponry and ammunition for the Armed Forces of the Philippines (AFP), and the Philippine National Police (PNP), among others, and for the sale and export of products in excess of AFP/PNP requirements. On June 27, 2022, the Department of National Defense (Philippines) signed an agreement with the Authority of the Freeport Area of Bataan to set-up the country's first Defense Industry Economic Zone.
Hermosa Ecozone and Industrial Park (Hermosa) - or shortened as HEIP is a 162-hectares industrial estate component of a 478-hectare mixed-use property development in the province of Bataan by the Hermosa Ecozone Development Corporation an arm of the Science Park of the Philippines, Incorporated. The project is a registered Special Economic Zone (Ecozone) under the Philippine Economic Zone Authority (PEZA).
Bataan 2020, Inc. (Samal) - Bataan 2020 is a leading manufacturer of fine quality paper, board and tissue in the Philippines. The company is among the most diversified paper mills in the industry, with a capacity of over 100,000 metric tons of paper annually.
Subic Special Economic and Freeport Zone - commonly shortened as Subic Bay, Subic Freeport, or Subic (but should no be mistaken for the municipality of Subic, Zambales), is a special economic and freeport zone covering portions of Olongapo and Subic in Zambales, and Morong and Hermosa in Bataan. The relatively developed and fenced area is called the Subic Bay Freeport Zone (SBFZ). This was the only freeport zone in Bataan from November 24, 1992 until the conversion of Bataan Export Processing Zone (BEPZ)/Bataan Economic Zone (BEZ) into Freeport Area of Bataan (FAB) in Mariveles on June 30, 2010.
Bataan Technology Park Inc. (Morong) - the 365-hectare property, is once the site of the Philippine Refugee Processing Center, which offered shelter to some 400,000 refugees from Vietnam, Laos and Cambodia. The property is now administered by Bases Conversion and Development Authority and is planned for an industrial and tourism development.
Tipo Hightech Eco Park (Hermosa) - or shortened as THEP is a 209-hectare mixed-use development located inside Subic Bay Freeport Zone expansion area straddling the municipality of Hermosa in Bataan and City of Olongapo. THEP development will include 101.47 hectares for light industries, 17.99 hectares for a commercial complex, 7.11 hectares for mixed use, 23.16 hectares for residential buildings, and 23.16 hectares for a nature and environment conservation park.
 Bataan Harbor City (Pilar) - is a 75.5-hectare mixed-use development with a neighboring port facility that is currently being built in the town of Pilar.

Bataan is also a strategic transport route and transshipment point linking the Subic Special Economic and Freeport Zone and the rest of the western part of Central Luzon region to Metro Manila. Several private ports, dry docks and ship yards, and oil terminals are operating along its long eastern coast facing Manila Bay. Among these are San Miguel Corporation Shipping and Lighterage, Petron Corporation Limay Terminal, PNOC jetty, Planters Products Inc. Bulk Handling Terminal, Seasia-Nectar Terminal, Oilink Terminal, Jetti Petroleum Terminal, Orion Dockyard, Herma Shipyard, Seafront Terminal and Shipyard, Liquigaz Philippines LPG Terminal and Filoil/Total Philippines Terminal.

Agriculture and Fisheries
Agriculture and fishery productions are major sources of income for the people of Bataan. Productions range from crops, fruits, fish, shellfish and other marine species. About 44,000 hectares of land are utilized for farming. The top five agricultural crops produced by the province are palay (rice), corn, coconut, mango and banana. Bataan is frequently included in the top ten poultry and poultry product producers in the country, it hosts modern poultry dressing and processing plants owned by San Miguel Corporation and Bounty Fresh Chicken. The municipalities of Dinalupihan, Hermosa, Orani, Samal, Abucay, Pilar and Orion are the main contributors for agricultural output of the Province.

Being a peninsula, Bataan is one of the major sources of various marine products in Luzon, that include good quality tilapia, bangus (milkfish), tiger prawn, mud crab, and bivalves such as mussel, oyster and capiz.

Commerce and Services

Bataan is in a process of accelerated growth in commercial sector driven mainly by young entrepreneurs and the advent of online commerce. Based from the Philippine Statistics Authority, more than 10,000 micro, small and medium enterprises (MSME) are operating in the province. With an average of 126 enterprises available per 10,000 people, Bataan is considered as the most enterprising province in Central Luzon.

The City of Balanga, the capital of Bataan, is the prime commercial hub in the province and hosting several shopping centers notably SM City Bataan, Vista Mall Bataan, Waltermart Balanga, Capitol Square, Galeria Victoria, Center Plaza Mall, Recar Commercial Complex and Ocampo's Megastore. In addition, a new shopping mall, Robinsons Place Balanga is expected to start construction soon. The municipalities of Dinalupihan, Hermosa, Orani, Mariveles and Orion are considered as secondary commercial hubs. The rest of the municipalities have established smaller business district enough to support the local demand.

Information Technology and Business Process Outsourcing

The City of Balanga is one of the twenty-five (25) emerging digital hubs identified by The Digital Cities 2025 program by the Department of Information and Communications Technology (DICT), Information Technology and Business Process Association of the Philippines (IBPAP), and Leechiu Property Consultants, Inc. (LPC). It hosts several outsourcing companies such as Genpact, Boston-based start-up Botkeeper, and Australia-based Yoonet. While in the town of Mariveles, the Freeport Area of Bataan is now hosting several blockchain and fintech firms. The town of Abucay is also being groomed as the province's next Business Process Outsourcing (BPO) hub thru its First Abucay Freeport Inc. which is a declared expansion area of the Authority of the Freeport Area of Bataan and with Cognizant as its first locator.

Banking and Finance
Bataan is served by most of the leading universal and commercial banks in the Philippines. Based from the Bangko Sentral ng Pilipinas (BSP) statistics, as of September 2021, there are 41 universal and commercial bank branches, 36 thrift bank branches, and 31 rural and cooperative bank branches scattered around the province but with the most numbers in the City of Balanga and towns of Dinalupihan and Mariveles.

Tourism
Bataan is rich in natural wonders and is also a popular heritage and historical destination especially due to its role during the beginning of the Pacific Theater of the Second World War.

Cultural and Historical Sites

Mount Samat National Shrine or Dambana ng Kagitingan in Pilar is the most notable historical landmark in the province. The shrine was commissioned in 1966 to commemorate the soldiers who fought during the Battle of Bataan. It is composed of a marble colonnade and a memorial cross towering 555 meters above sea level.
The First Line of Defense Marker located in Layac, Hermosa marks the first strong line of defense of the USAFFE forces against the Japanese Imperial Army Invasion during the Second World War.
The Bataan Death March marker, also known as 0-kilometer markers, are monuments located in towns of Mariveles and Bagac indicating the points of origin of the infamous Bataan Death March.
The Flaming Sword in Pilar is an obelisk located at the junction of Governor J.J. Linao National Road and Layac-Balanga-Mariveles Port Road marking the converging point of the prisoners from Bagac and Mariveles during the Bataan Death March.
The World War II Museum and Surrender Site Marker are both located inside the compound of Balanga Elementary School, the actual site where General Edward P. King negotiated the surrender of the 76,000 USAFFE soldiers to the Japanese Imperial Army.
The Filipino-Japanese Friendship Tower in Bagac is a monument to commemorate the re-establishment of the Filipino-Japanese diplomatic friendship after the World War II.
The Saint Dominic Parish Church or Abucay Church is a 17th-century church of Baroque style of architecture. Built in 1587 and administered by the Dominican Order friars, it housed the first printing presses in the Philippines.  The church was also a witness to the massacre of hundreds of Filipinos and Spaniards by the Dutch Invaders on June 23, 1647.
Diocesan Shrine and Cathedral Parish of St. Joseph or Balanga Cathedral is the seat of the Diocese of Balanga. During the World War II, the cathedral was used as an artillery emplacement by the Japanese Imperial Army to bombard USAFFE forces in Mount Samat.
Minor Basilica of Our Lady of the Most Holy Rosary or Orani Church is a neoclassical Diocesan Marian Shrine and Pilgrimage church located in the center of the town of Orani.
The Las Casas Filipinas de Acuzar in Bagac is a 40-hectare property housing several transplanted antique houses from different parts of the Philippines for preservation.

Ecotourism

Bataan National Park - is a protected forest reservation located in the mountainous parts of northern Bataan.
Roosevelt Protected Landscape - is a protected forest reservation that occupies an area of 786.04 hectares (1,942.3 acres) of grasslands and old-growth forest in northern Bataan province near Olongapo and the Subic Bay Freeport Zone.
Mariveles Five Fingers - located at the southern tip of Bataan Peninsula, is a series of coves that looks like five human fingers when viewed from the air.
Tarak Ridge - is popular among mountaineers, is one of the peaks of Mount Mariveles' volcano-caldera complex. 
Dunsulan Falls - is a waterfall at the foot of Mount Samat. Dunsulan falls and river is the main drainage on the crater side of Mount Samat.
Mount Malasimbo - is a conical-shape mountain in Dinalupihan that is popular to mountaineers.
Sibul Sprint and Pasukulan Falls in Abucay
Balon Anito in Mariveles
Pintong Alipi Falls - is an 80-foot high  waterfall in Mount Silangan in Morong.
Laki Beach - is a natural powdery-white sand beach in Mariveles
Playa La Caleta Cove in Morong
Camaya Coast - is a recreational development located in a cove in the southern tip of Mariveles.
Ocean Adventure - is an open-space marine zoological park in the Morong, inside the Subic Special Economic and Freeport Zone.

Festivals and Holidays
The Day of Valor or locally known as Araw ng Kagitingan, is a national observance in the Philippines to commemorate the Defenders of Bataan. It falls every 9th day of April.
The Bataan Foundation Day is a local holiday falling every 11 January to celebrate the founding of the Province of Bataan, through the virtue of the Republic Act No. 11138.
The Pawikan Festival in Morong is celebrated annually every last week of November or first week of December to recognize the local community's successes in its marine turtle conservation campaign.
The Ibong Dayo Festival, celebrated annually every February in the City of Balanga, is a popular attraction among bird enthusiasts. The aim of the festival is to disseminate to the public the importance of wetland conservation to migratory birds.
The Diocesan Pilgrimage in Mount Samat, is an annual event of the Diocese of Balanga since 2004 and is attended by thousands of young people from Bataan and different provinces in Luzon. The pilgrims walk seven kilometers from the foot of Mt. Samat up to the World War II shrine on top of the mountain.

Infrastructure

Power

Generation

Bataan is a location of bulk power generation, where most of the power generated is sent to the Luzon Grid. Most power plants in Bataan rely on fossil fuels, like oil and coal, but renewable energy sources, primarily solar power, form part of the total generation. As of December 31, 2021, the total installed capacity of existing power plants equals to 2,897.8 MW. Incoming power plants that are under construction will increase the output to 4,277.64 MW, with targeted commissioning date of 4th quarter, 2022 to 1st quarter, 2023.

Fossil fuel-fired plants account for 2,803 MW, and are mostly concentrated in Limay and Mariveles. These include the GN Power Mariveles Coal Power Plant, with 690 (2x345) MW, SMC Limay Greenfield Power Plant (4x150 MW), Petron Cogeneration Power Plant (4x35 MW), Panasia Bataan Combined Cycle Power Plant (648 MW), and the recently commissioned GN Power Dinginin Unit 1 (725 MW). Three plants are under construction, the GN Power Dinginin Unit 2 (725 MW), Petron's Refinery Solid Fuel-Fired Boiler Project - Phase 3 (44 MW), and SMC Mariveles Coal Power Plant (4x150 MW). These will increase the capacity by 1,369 MW. Three natural gas-fired power plants with combined capacity of 3,275 MW are proposed, one planned in Limay and two in Mariveles. These are currently endorsed by the Department of Energy (Philippines) for grid-impact study.

Renewable energy, accounts for 92.4 MW. Existing renewable energy power plants include the Bataan 2020 Cogen Power Plant (12.5 MW), Cleangreen Energy Corp. Napier Grass Fired Power Plant (12 MW), YH Green Energy Solar Power Plant (12.6 MW), Citicore Solar Power Plant (18 MW), Morong Solar Power Plant (5 MW), and Jobin-Sqm Inc.'s Sta. Rita Solar (32.3 MW) in Tipo, Hermosa side of Subic Bay Freeport Zone. While additional 11.64 MW are expected from two projects that are on the advanced stage of construction, these are Citicore's 6.64 MW solar rooftop project in the Freeport Area of Bataan, and Ayala Corp.'s Bataan Solar Energy Inc. with 5 MW in Batangas Dos, Mariveles. Two more solar power projects are in the pipeline - Solana Solar Power Project (28 MW) and Jobin-Sqm Inc. Bataan Solar Power Project Phases 1, 2, 3a-3b (100 MW). Also, two wind power projects are planned, the 500 MW Bagac Bay Offshore Wind Project and 300 MW Bagac Bay Onshore Wind Project, both by Earth Sol Power Corporation. These are also endorsed by the Department of Energy for grid impact study.

In 2021, San Miguel Corporation's Universal Power Solutions Inc. together with its partner Wärtsilä commissioned the first Battery Energy Storage System (BESS) in Limay with 40 MW/40MWh capacity. Three more BESS projects are committed to be built - Hermosa Battery Energy Storage System (40 MW/40MWh), Lamao Battery Energy Storage System Phases 1 and 2 (30 MW/30MWh, 20 MW/20MWh), and BCCP Limay Battery Energy Storage System Project Phase 2 (20 MW/40MWh). All by Universal Power Solutions Incorporated.

The Bataan Nuclear Power Plant in Morong, with a design 600 MW capacity, was supposed to be the first nuclear power plant in the Philippines. It was supposed to commence operation in 1986, but was mothballed amidst critical opposition to the Marcos regime and concerns on nuclear power. There is some discussion of either rehabilitating the plant, which would likely be uneconomical, or constructing a new nuclear power station.

Transmission
Power is transmitted to the province through various transmission lines and substations located within the province. There are four transmission substations located within the province which are the Hermosa, Balsik EHV, Limay, and Mariveles EHV substations of National Grid Corporation of the Philippines (NGCP). Since 2018, the province has a network of 500 kV transmission lines which are the Mariveles-Hermosa, Hermosa-San Jose, Hermosa-Castillejos, GNPower Dinginin-NGCP Mariveles, and MPGC – Mariveles Power Plant-NGCP Mariveles lines. The first three transmission lines are operated and maintained by NGCP while the last two are dedicated point-to-point generation facilities being operated by respective power generation companies.

Distribution

Power distribution in the province are served by the Peninsula Electric Cooperative (PENELCO), but some large customers have their power supply sourced from the transmission grid, whose network of 69,000 volt lines supply substations owned by PENELCO. On Freeport Area of Bataan (FAB) and barangays Malaya and Maligaya, they are served by the Utility Management Department (UMD) of National Transmission Corporation (TransCo).

Airport

Subic Bay International Airport – located in Cubi Point, Mabayo, Morong area of Subic Bay Freeport Zone. It serves as a secondary and diversion airport for Ninoy Aquino International Airport and Clark International Airport. The airport was formerly the Naval Air Station Cubi Point, part of the U.S. Naval Base Subic Bay, before the base closed in 1992.

Seaports

Port Management
Port Management Office (PMO) - Bataan/Aurora of the Philippine Ports Authority is responsible for financing, management and operations of public ports operating in Bataan. Currently there are three government-owned ports, and these are: 
Port of Lamao/Limay – Baseport (PMO)
Port of Mariveles – Subport (TMO)
Port of Capinpin/Orion– Subport (TMO)

Limay and Mariveles ports are primarily used by tramper vessels/tankers catering to the requirement of industries and companies operating in the province. While the Port of Capinpin is equipped for Roll-on/roll-off (Ro-Ro) vessels to carry passengers which is served by 1Bataan Integrated Transport System from Esplanade Seaside Terminal at the Mall of Asia, Pasay to Orion and vice versa.

There are also 15 private ports/terminals that are operating in the province, namely:
Jetti Petroleum Inc. (Mariveles)
OilLink International Corporation (Mariveles)
Petron Bataan Refinery (PBR) (Limay)
PNOC (Mariveles)
Planters Products Inc. (PPI)/GPII (Limay)
Seafront Shipyard (Mariveles)
SL Harbor Bulk Terminal Corporation (SLHBTC) (Limay)
SMC Consolidated Power Corporation (Limay)
GN Power (Mariveles)
ATI Mariveles Grains Corporation (MGC) (Mariveles)
Herma/Mariveles Shipyard Corporation (MSC) (Mariveles)
SMC-Shipping and Lighterage (Mariveles)
Total Philippines (Mariveles)
Seasia-Nectar Mariveles Dry Bulk Terminal (Mariveles)
Bataan Nuclear Power Plant Pier (Morong)

The Subic Bay International Terminal Corporation in Cubi Point, Subic Bay Freeport Zone, while geographically within Bataan thru the municipality of Morong, is administered by Subic Bay Metropolitan Authority.

Customs Administration
Thru the Customs Administrative Order (CAO)-05-2008, the new Collection District No. XVI to be known as Bureau of Customs (BOC)-Port Limay was established. It has jurisdiction and is responsible for assessment and collection of customs revenues from imported goods and other dues, fees, charges, fines and penalties accruing under the Customs Modernization and Tariff Act (RA 10863) from all ports within the province of Bataan excluding the portions of the province that is within the Subic Special Economic and Freeport Zone as defined by R.A. No. 7227. The BOC-Port of Limay is considered as the third largest port in the Philippines in terms of revenue collection, behind Manila International Container Port (MICP) and Port of Batangas. The total revenue collection of BOC-Port of Limay reached from the months of January to November in 2022 reached more than PhP 106 billions (equivalent to USD 1.9 billion).

Highways, expressways and national roads

Bataan is served by a network of national highways and two expressways. Roman Superhighway, part of highway N301, and Jose Abad Santos Avenue, or highway N3 and Olongapo-Gapan Road, forms the backbone of the national highway network. Subic–Clark–Tarlac Expressway and Subic Freeport Expressway, are toll expressways, linking the province with Pampanga, Tarlac and Subic Special Economic and Freeport Zone. The Layac-Balanga-Mariveles Port Road (a.k.a. Old National Road), Bagac-Mariveles Road, SBMA-Morong Road and Governor J.J. Linao National Road forms the secondary network, which connects the smaller municipalities with the main highway network

An Asian Development Bank-supported 32-kilometer bridge called Bataan–Cavite Interlink Bridge is proposed to connect Bataan with Cavite crossing Manila Bay. The contract for detailed engineering and design was awarded in October 2020. The Philippine Department of Public Works and Highways announced that the bridge's construction is targeted to start before the year 2023 ends.

Sports facilities
Public sports facilities are dispersed across the province. Indoor sports arenas or gymnasiums are located in the towns of Dinalupihan, Hermosa, Orani, Orion, Limay and Mariveles, and there are two in the City of Balanga. An olympic-size swimming pool frequently used for local competitions is situated in the town of Abucay. While the town of Dinalupihan hosts the remaining athletics track and field in the province after the conversion of former Bataan Provincial Oval in Balanga to a public highschool.

There are three privately-owned golf courses in the province, these are:
Anvaya Cove Golf and Sports Club - is an 82-hectare, 18-hole all-weather, 7,200 yard, par 72 championship golf course located in Ayala Land's Anvaya Cove development in Morong.
Tandatangan Golf Course - by Camaya Coast, consists of 9 signature golf holes with a total of 36 Par, 2,994 Meters and 3,275 Yards. Located approximately 170 meters above sea level.
The Peninsula Golf Club - is an 18-hole golf course laid out around the Petron Bataan Refinery's Housing Compound in Limay. A pair of tee-boxes is provided for each hole to complete an 18-hole round of golf. It is a relatively short golf course at just par 68, with a rating of 65.4 and a corresponding slope of 116.

The province will also be the site of the Philippine Sports Training Center (PSTC) in Bagac. The PSTC is targeted for completion in 2025.

Education
As of 2018, literacy rate in Bataan is 99.4% (Literacy of the Household Population 10 Years Old and Over). Access to education opportunities is provided by 259 elementary schools, 84 secondary schools and 19 tertiary schools, owned and operated by either the government or private persons/groups. There are also 6 TESDA-accredited institutions offering technical/vocational courses.

Educational Institutions
Bataan Peninsula State University or BPSU is a state-owned university and the leading tertiary education provider in the province. It was established by virtue of Republic Act 9403, signed into law on 22 March 2007. It is a conglomeration of five state-owned higher education institutions in Bataan. The university currently has six campuses scattered across the province - the Main Campus (formerly Bataan National School of Arts and Trade), Balanga Campus (formerly Bataan Community Colleges), Abucay Campus (formerly Bataan National Agricultural School), Dinalupihan Campus (formerly Bataan State College), Orani Campus (formerly Bataan National Polytechnic School), and Bagac Campus. Its seventh campus in Sabang, Morong, Bataan is now under construction

Another state-owned higher education institution in the province is Polytechnic University of the Philippines Bataan, which is a satellite campus of the Polytechnic University of the Philippines in Sta. Mesa, Manila, established in 1976. It is located inside the Freeport Area of Bataan (FAB) in Mariveles.

Other notable tertiary education institutions in Bataan are listed below:

AMA Computer Learning Center – Balanga
APG International Aviation Academy – Cubi Point, Subic Bay Freeport Zone, Morong
Asia Pacific College of Advanced Studies (APCAS) – Balanga
Bataan Heroes Memorial College – Balanga
Bataan Maritime Institute – Balanga
Colegio de San Juan de Letran Bataan – Abucay 
College of Subic Montessori – Dinalupihan
Eastwoods College of Science and Technology – Dinalupihan
EastWoods Professional College of Science and Technology (formerly SOFTNET College of Science and Technology) – Balanga 
Fist Aviation Academy, Inc. – Cubi Point, Subic Bay Freeport Zone, Morong
Limay Polytechnic College – Limay
Maritime Academy of Asia and the Pacific – Mariveles
Microcity College of Business and Technology (Formerly: Microcity Computer College Foundation, Inc.) – Balanga
Omni Aviation School – Cubi Point, Subic Bay Freeport Zone, Morong
Philippine Women's University CDCEC Bataan - Balanga
St. Joseph Colleges of Balanga – Balanga
Softnet Information Technology Center – Mariveles
Tomas del Rosario College – Balanga
University of Nueva Caceres – Dinalupihan

Iskolar ng Bataan
Iskolar ng Bataan is a provincial government-funded tertiary education scholarship program with a primary goal of producing at least one professional in every household in the province and be gainfully employed in the trade and industries operating inside or outside the province.

Bataan Highschool for the Arts
Through Republic Act No. 11190, the Bataan High School for the Arts is established as the second specialized public high school in the Philippines offering arts-focused education after the Makiling-based Philippine High School for the Arts (PHSA).

The School aims to develop artistically gifted and talented students by implementing a special secondary education curriculum and support programs committed to the conservation and promotion of the Filipino artistic and cultural traditions. This is also a Center for Arts and Design of the Senior High School Program among the twenty school divisions of Central Luzon. Through the establishment of the BHSA, DepEd will be able to help select, stimulate, and prepare students for a career in the arts and cultural work who will serve the region and the country.

Notable people

National Heroes and Patriots

Cayetano Arellano (Orion) – first Supreme Court Chief Justice of the Republic of the Philippines
Francisco Baltazar (Orion) – one of the greatest Filipino literary laureates, born in Bigaa (Balagtas), Bulacan, but spent his adult life in Orion, Bataan
Pablo Tecson - was an officer in the Revolutionary Army serving under Gen. Gregorio del Pilar and a member of the Philippine Assembly in Malolos representing Bataan's at-large district.
Oscar Joson (Balanga) - is the youngest Filipino to receive the US Congressional Gold Medal for bravery and sacrifice of own life. He was a 14-year old Boy Scout who died in Balanga during the early days of World War II.
Tomas Pinpin (Abucay) – is remembered for being the first Filipino to publish and print a book, "Librong Pagaaralan nang mga Tagalog nang Uicang Castilla" (Reference Book for Learning Castellano in Tagalog) in 1610, entirely written by himself in the old Tagalog orthography.
Tomas del Rosario (Orani) – judge, statesman and first governor of the province of Bataan from 1903 to 1905. He was one of the delegates to the Malolos Congress in 1898 and to the Philippine Assembly from 1909 to 1912.

Politics, Military and Government

Alfredo Juinio (Limay) – was a former Secretary of Department of Public Works and Highways. He also served as the Dean of the College of Engineering of the University of the Philippines. Alfredo Juinio Hall, the building that houses the National Engineering Center, is named after him. He was once described as "one of the country's most brilliant engineers."
Cesar Banzon Bautista (Balanga) - was the 13th Ambassador of the Republic of the Philippines to the United Kingdom and was the Secretary of Trade and Industry (Philippines) from 1996 to 1998.
Emilio Gancayco (Orion) – a lawyer who served as Associate Justice of the Supreme Court of the Philippines from January 12, 1987 to August 22, 1997.
Felicito Payumo (Dinalupihan) – was the Chairman of the Subic Bay Metropolitan Authority from 1998 to 2004, and Bases Conversion and Development Authority from 2011 to 2012. He also represented the First District of Bataan in the House of Representatives of the Philippines from 1987 to 1998. He was principal author of the Build, Operate, and Transfer Law, the Philippine Economic Zone Authority (PEZA) Law, and the Act converting the military bases into special economic zones.
Fulgencio Factoran (Orion) - a lawyer and an advocate of freedom of the press in the Philippines. He served as Secretary of Environment and Natural Resources from 1987 until 1992, and Deputy Executive Secretary (1986-1987) of former President Corazon C. Aquino. 
Geraldine Roman (Orani) – journalist and politician, she is the first transgender woman elected to the Philippine House of Representatives.
Harry Roque (Limay) – a lawyer and the presidential spokesperson of President Rodrigo Duterte from 2017 to 2018 and from 2020 to 2021.
Ismael L. Mathay Sr. (Balanga) -  served as Auditor General of the Philippines from 1966 until 1972, under President Ferdinand Marcos. He is the father of former Quezon City mayor Mel Mathay. Ismael Mathay Sr. High School in Quezon City was named after him.
Luz Banzon (Balanga) – wife of Philippine President Ramon Magsaysay; seventh First Lady of the Philippines
Merceditas Gutierrez (Samal) – was a two-time Justice Secretary of the Philippine Justice Department during the administration of Gloria Macapagal Arroyo, Gutierrez also became the first woman to head the post of Ombudsman. She assumed the position on December 1, 2005, and resigned from office on April 29, 2011.
Manuel C. Herrera (Pilar) – was a deputy Ombudsman during the Marcos regime and later, head of the prosecution panel in the Benigno Aquino Jr., and later became one of the justices of the Court of Appeals from 1987 to 1997, and chair of the National Unification Commission.
Norberto Gonzales (Balanga) - was the Secretary of National Defense (July 2, 2007 – August 7, 2007), and National Security Adviser (February 2005 – July 2, 2007)
Pedro Tuason (Balanga) – Solicitor General of the Philippines (1921), he also served as Justice Secretary during the administration of President Ramon Magsaysay (1953-1957).
Romeo Espino (Samal) – was a military general who served as Chief of Staff of the Armed Forces of the Philippines from 1971 to 1980.

Business and Economy

David Consunji (Samal) – founder of publicly listed holding firm, DMCI Holdings, Incorporated. He was a former secretary of the Department of Public Works, Transportation and Communications from 1970 to 1975. In 2014, Forbes listed him as the 6th richest Filipino, with a net worth of US$3.9 billion.
Jose Acuzar (Balanga) - also known as "Jerry" Acuzar, is a prominent real estate businessman. He founded and owns New San Jose Builders, Inc, Manuel L. Quezon University in Quezon City, and the renowned heritage resort Las Casas Filipinas de Acuzar. On July 29, 2022, newly elected President Ferdinand Marcos Jr. appointed him as Secretary of Department of Housing Settlements and Urban Development (DHSUD).
Jose Isidro Camacho (Balanga) - is a Filipino banker who served as the Philippines' Secretary of Energy and later on as Finance under President Gloria Macapagal Arroyo. He is also a member of the Group of Experts of the ASEAN Capital Markets Forum, Singapore's Securities Industry Council, and the International Advisory Panel of the Securities Commission of Malaysia.
Manuel Bamba Villar Jr. (Orani) – from 2019 to 2022, Forbes magazine named Villar as the richest individual in the Philippines, with an estimated net worth of $8.3 billion. He founded Vista Land. He was a Senator from 2001 to 2013 and as the President of the Senate of the Philippines from 2006 to 2008.
Miguel Cuaderno Sr. (Balanga) - was the 17th Finance Secretary of the Philippines under Manuel Roxas and the first Governor of the Central Bank of the Philippines from 1949 to 1960. He's also a constitutionalist being one of the “Seven Wise Men” who drafted the 1935 Philippine Constitution.
Orlando Banzon Vea (Balanga) - commonly known as Doy Vea in the tech sector, he co-founded Smart Communications along with David Fernando in 1991. He has since moved to several positions, including Chief Executive Officer, President and Director of PLDT Communications and Energy Ventures as well as CEO, President and Director of DigiTel (Sun Cellular).

Education, Arts and Sciences

Benjamin Tayabas (Hermosa) - is a US-trained Filipino educator and administrator. He is the longest-serving university president of the Pamantasan ng Lungsod ng Maynila.
Heny Sison (Orani) - a renowned pastry chef and teacher. Through the years, she's had a whole range of students—from housewives to celebrities to small-time entrepreneurs who would become success stories, among them the Lorenzanas behind Wildflour, the owner of Costa Brava, even Baby Yulo of Forbes Park's famous strawberry shortcake.
Julian Banzon (Balanga) - is a National Scientist of the Philippines for Chemistry
Julián Cruz Balmaceda (Orion) - was a Filipino poet, essayist, playwright, novelist, journalist and linguist. He made several works written in Filipino, English and Spanish languages.
Lázaro Francisco (Orani) - was a Filipino novelist, essayist and playwright. Francisco was posthumously named a National Artist of the Philippines for Literature in 2009.
Leonila dela Fuente Dans (Balanga) - A medical researcher and consultant. She is a recipient of 2022 Metrobank Foundation Outstanding Filipinos Award. Her book, "Painless Evidence-Based Medicine", which she co-wrote with husband Dr. Antonio L. Dans and Dr. Maria Asuncion A. Silvestre, is a bestseller among rheumatologists. Her researches include “Randomized Controlled Trial and Cost Benefit Analysis-Zinc Implementation for Acute Diarrhea” for children less than five years old, and the “Utilization of Clinical Practice Guidelines in the Philippines.”

Religion

Manuel C. Sobreviñas (Dinalupihan) - Bishop Emeritus of the Roman Catholic Diocese of Imus
Oscar V. Cruz (Balanga) – Archbishop Emeritus of the Roman Catholic Archdiocese of Lingayen-Dagupan

Sports and Entertainment

Bea Magtanong (Abucay) - also known as Patch Magtanong, is a Filipino lawyer, beauty queen and fashion model who was crowned Binibining Pilipinas International 2019.
Divina Valencia (Abucay) - a Filipina actress from the 1960s.
Elisse Joson (Balanga) - Filipina actress, endorser, model and businesswoman
Erika Casupanan (Hermosa) - winner of Survivor 41
Evangeline Pascual (Orani) – actress and First Runner-up Miss World 1973
Gary David (Dinalupihan) – a professional basketball player, a member of 2014 Gilas Pilipinas
Iona Violeta Abrera Gibbs (Limay) - a beauty queen who was crowned Mutya ng Pilipinas for the year 2022.
Janine Tugonon (Orion) – model, TV host and beauty pageant titleholder- Miss Universe 2012 first runner-up
Jessica Sanchez (Samal) – a singer-songwriter. She rose to prominence following her finish as the runner-up on the eleventh season of American Idol.
Kerby Raymundo (Orion) – a professional basketball star 
Mel Tiangco (Pilar) – popular television newscaster and television host; head of GMA Kapuso foundation
Rodel Naval (Orion) – Filipino singer, songwriter and actor. 
Romi Garduce (Balanga) – was among the first Filipinos to reach the peak of Mount Everest

See also
Bataan Provincial Expressway
Petron Corporation (formerly known as Bataan Refining Corporation)
Roman Catholic Diocese of Balanga
Freeport Area of Bataan

References

External links

Bataan official website

 
1754 establishments in the Philippines
Provinces of the Philippines
Provinces of Central Luzon
States and territories established in 1754